Ursula Munch-Petersen (born 29 December 1937) is a Danish ceramist.

Biography
Born in Rønne on the island of Bornholm, Ursula Munch-Petersen is the daughter of Gustaf and Lisbeth Munch-Petersen, both of whom were also ceramists and potters. She attended the Kunsthåndværkerskolen (design school) in Copenhagen from 1956 to 1960 and the Royal Danish Academy of Fine Arts from 1970 to 1972. In 1962, she married the artist Erik Hagens. She grew up on Bornholm and after graduating from the Academy, worked for a year in the family business in Rønne. In 1978, she acquired her own studio on Møn.

Munch-Petersen's work extends from artistically designed individual items to mass-produced series of tableware. In the 1960s, she designed for Bing and Grøndahl but later worked for Royal Copenhagen. Her Ursula series is produced by Kähler Keramik.

Awards
In 1994 Munch-Petersen received the Thorvald Bindesbøll Medal, in 2002 the Prince Eugen Medal, in 2004 the Georg Jensen Prize
and in 2016 the C. F. Hansen Medal.

References

External links
Ursula Munch-Petersen's website

1937 births
Living people
20th-century Danish ceramists
Danish women artisans
20th-century ceramists
21st-century ceramists
People from Bornholm
Royal Danish Academy of Fine Arts alumni
Danish women ceramists
Recipients of the Prince Eugen Medal
Recipients of the Thorvald Bindesbøll Medal
Recipients of the C.F. Hansen Medal
20th-century Danish women artists
20th-century Danish artists
21st-century Danish women artists